This is a list of preprint repositories.

List

See also 
 List of academic journals by preprint policy
 List of copyright policies of academic publishers

Explanatory notes

References

External links 
 ASAPBio's list of preprint servers

Academic publishing
Eprint archives
Preprint repositories